The Cordillera of Dreams ( / ) is a 2019 French-Chilean documentary film directed by Patricio Guzmán. It is considered the third installment in a trilogy of films by Guzmán about his native country, Chile, alongside Nostalgia for the Light (2010) and The Pearl Button (2015).

The film was nominated for Best Documentary Film at the 45th César Awards, being the second nomination for Guzmán in this category after The Pearl Button in 2016. The film was selected as the Chilean entry for Best Iberoamerican Film at the 36th Goya Awards, later receiving the nomination.

Release
The film premiered at the 2019 Cannes Film Festival in the Special screenings section. At the festival, the film shared the L'Œil d'or award with For Sama.

Reception
On review aggregator website Rotten Tomatoes, the film holds an approval rating of 91% based on 23 reviews, with an average rating of 8.10. On Metacritic, the film holds a rating of 83 out of 100, based on 6 critics, indicating "universal acclaim".

Deborah Young of The Hollywood Reporter wrote about the film that "in and of itself, it is a mournfully intelligent, poetic documentary that once more seeks to link the vastness, grandeur and indifference of nature with the human horrors that Chileans have lived through". Jessica Kiang of Variety commented about the film and its place within Guzmán's trilogy of films, writing that "taken as a completed project, Guzmán's late-career trinity is a stunning achievement in the cinema of the hidden pattern and the startling, unexpected connection".

Awards and nominations

References

External links
 

Chilean documentary films
French documentary films
2019 films
2019 documentary films
2010s French films